The John Daly House in Boise, Idaho, is a 2-story, Colonial Revival house designed by Tourtellotte & Hummel and constructed in 1910. The house was added to the National Register of Historic Places in 1982.

John D. Daly was a prominent banker and real estate owner. He helped to found the Idaho Trust and Savings Bank and the Pacific National Bank (First Security Bank) in Boise, and he had been associated with at least two Oregon banks, the First National Bank in Ontario and the First National Bank in Burns. The Daly Addition, adjacent to the western boundary of the Harrison Boulevard Historic District, was named for John D. Daly.

References

External links

National Register of Historic Places in Boise, Idaho
Colonial Revival architecture in Idaho
Neoclassical architecture in Idaho
Houses completed in 1910